This article lists the squads for the 2012 CONCACAF Women's U-17 Championship, to be held in Guatemala. The 8 national teams involved in the tournament were required to register a squad of 20 players; only players in these squads were eligible to take part in the tournament.

Players marked (c) were named as captain for their national squad. Number of caps, players' club teams and players' age as of 1 March 2012 – the tournament's opening day.

Group A

Canada
Coach: Bryan Rosenfeld

Guatemala
Coach: Benjamín Monterroso

Jamaica
Coach: Vinimore Blaine

Panama
Coach: Luis Tejada

Group B

Bahamas
Coach: Daria Adderly

Mexico
Coach: Leonardo Cuéllar

Trinidad and Tobago
Coach:  Even Pellerud

United States
Coach: Albertin Montoya

References

Squads
2012 in youth sport